Nome River is a waterway on the Seward Peninsula in the U.S. state of Alaska.

Geography
In several places between Osborn and Darling creeks the river flats reach a width of a mile without attaining an elevation more than 50 feet higher than the top of the river banks. North of Darling Creek the valley narrows decidedly and below Osborn Creek it enters the coastal plain. It leaves this valley as a mountain torrent and debouches in a broad, gravel-filled valley, part of the depression already described, which extends along the southern margin of the Kigluaik Mountains. From Dexter Creek to Hobson Creek the river level rises 107 feet, or at the rate of 8 feet to the mile, and from Hobson Creek to the mouth of Deep Canyon Creek it rises 393 feet, or at the rate of 44 feet to the mile. The Nome River Valley has the same character as the Eldorado—that is, a broad upper basin, connected by a board pass with Kruzgamepa River waters, and below this basin a constricted valley, and nearer the sea a broad valley whose floor merges into the coastal plain. Most of the mining developments in the coastal plain of the Nome mining district are west of Nome River, but at several localities, prospects have been opened up to the east of the river.

Tributaries
Stevens and Washington gulches flow through the tundra from the hill south of Osborn Creek into Nome River. Buster Creek, flowing from the northeast, enters Nom River a short distance below Dexter Creek; Lillian Creek is a tributary of Buster. Dorothy Creek is tributary to the upper part of Nome River; it flows through a small canyon having a general northerly course.

See also
List of rivers of Alaska

References

Sources

Rivers of the Seward Peninsula
Rivers of Alaska
Rivers of Nome Census Area, Alaska
Rivers of Unorganized Borough, Alaska